Kotev is a surname. Notable people with the surname include:

Dimitar Kotev (1941–2001), Bulgarian Olympic cyclist
Kiril Kotev (born 1982), Bulgarian football player

Bulgarian-language surnames